Time Piece is a 1965 American experimental short film directed, written, produced by and starring Jim Henson. The film depicts an ordinary man living in constant motion, in a desperate attempt to escape the passage of time. Time Piece is notable as one of the few live-action projects Jim Henson produced that did not involve any form of puppetry. The short film was nominated for an Academy Award for Best Live Action Short Film in 1966.

Plot
The fast-paced scenes in Time Piece are edited together in a rhythmic pentameter, with an underlying use of sounds and repetitive beats. The film begins with a young man (who provides only four brief words of dialogue who just quotes "help") sitting patiently in a hospital bed. An unidentified doctor enters the room and checks the man's heart rate, which begins to pulse rhythmically.

As the rhythm increases, the film begins to follow the man's daily habits such as crossing a busy street, in different clothes and different locations, working in a busy office, working on a conveyor belt, walking through different locations and ending up in a forest where he has the appearance of Tarzan, eating dinner with his wife, walking down the street seeing pogo stick riders, and visiting a strip club while simultaneously maintaining himself in motion.

Eventually, the man is imprisoned for shooting the Mona Lisa while intoxicated (signified by a scene of him painting an elephant pink) and dressed as a cowboy and is forced to perform acts of labor like working in the rock pile. The man eventually escapes from prison and begins to frantically run across a long distance with different disguises like a man in a top hat and Tarzan while evading cowboys. The man then jumps off a diving board and soars into the sky (aided by a flying device) where he is subsequently shot down by the world's military powers. He falls from the sky defeated and lands in a muddy puddle in the form of a rustic clock. The clock strikes twelve and the film's events flash quickly on-screen.

Back in the hospital room, the doctor covers the man's seemingly lifeless body. The camera then pans up towards the doctor's face, revealing him to be the same man smiling gleefully and winks at the camera.

Cast
 Jim Henson - Man, Doctor with face
 Enid Cafritz - Man's Wife
 Jerry Juhl - Bartender
 Frank Oznowicz - Office Messenger Boy, Man in Gorilla Suit, Dead man, Doctor without face
 April March - Stripper
 Sandy Patterson - 
 Diana Birkenfield - 
 Dave Bailey - Drummer
 Dennis Paget - 
 Jim Hutchison - Club Dancer
 Barbara Richman - Club Dancer

Production
Unlike most films, Time Piece was not written as a script. Instead, Jim Henson had storyboarded the entire film prior to filming. Between shuffling performances with The Muppets for The Jimmy Dean Show and film commercials, Henson shot the film intermittently from June 1964 to May 1965. Due to this restricted time frame, every shot in the film lasts only one to four seconds. Henson even calculated the amount of frames each shot would contain.

Henson solely produced the film's animation sequences, while Muppet designer Don Sahlin was responsible for the film's visual effects shots.

Legendary Blue Note Records engineer Rudy Van Gelder recorded the music.

Release
Henson premiered Time Piece at the Museum of Modern Art in New York City in 1965. The film also had a lengthy screening run at the Paris Theatre in Manhattan.

Time Piece was released theatrically in the United States with Claude Lelouch's A Man and a Woman. In addition to its Academy Award nomination, the film also won the CINE Eagle Award and the American Film Festival's Blue Ribbon Award, and received recognition at the XII International Short Film Festival Oberhausen.

See also
List of American films of 1965
Art film
Modernist film

References

External links
 
 Excerpts of Time Piece on official YouTube channel
 Time Piece on Fandor
 Time Piece film on Facebook
 MUBI

1965 films
1965 short films
American independent films
American short films
American avant-garde and experimental films
Short films directed by Jim Henson
Films set in New York City
Films shot in Nevada
Films shot in Connecticut
Films shot in New York City
Films shot in New Jersey
Short films with live action and animation
The Jim Henson Company films
Films about time
Films produced by Jim Henson
1960s English-language films
1960s American films
1965 independent films